This article is a summary of the literary events and publications of 1595.

Events
May 24 – The Nomenclator of Leiden University Library appears as the first printed catalog of an institutional library.
December 9 – Shakespeare's Richard II is possibly acted privately at the Canon Row house of Sir Edward Hoby, with Sir Robert Cecil attending.
unknown dates
The first part of Ginés Pérez de Hita's Historia de los bandos de los Zegríes y Abencerrajes (Guerras civiles de Granada) appears. Supposedly a chronicle of the Morisco rebellions in Granada based on an Arabic original, it is probably the earliest historical novel and certainly the first to gain popularity.
Lope de Vega leaves the service of the Duke of Alba and returns to Madrid, after the death of his first wife Isabel in the previous year.

New books

Prose
Mikalojus Daukša – Kathechismas, arba Mokslas kiekvienam krikščioniui privalus
Justus Lipsius – De militia romana
Nicholas Remy – Daemonolatreiae libri tres
Sir Philip Sidney (posthumous, written 1580–83) – An Apology for Poetry
Vincentio Saviolo – His practise, in two bookes. (first manual of fencing in English)
Fausto Veranzio – Dictionarium quinque nobilissimarum Europæ linguarum, Latinæ, Italicæ, Germanicæ, Dalmatiæ, & Vngaricæ published in Latin in Venice

Drama
Anonymous – Locrine (published claiming to be revised by "W. S.")
Jakob Ayrer – Von der Erbauung Roms (Of the Building of Rome)
Gervase Markham – The Most Honorable Tragedy of Sir Richard Grinville
Antoine de Montchrestien – Sophonisbe
Robert Wilson? – The Pedlers Prophecie
Approximate year
William Alabaster, Roxana
William Shakespeare, Richard II
Romeo and Juliet
A Midsummer Night's Dream

Poetry

Barnabe Barnes – A Divine Century of Spiritual Sonnets
Richard Barnfield – Cynthia
Thomas Campion – Poemata
George Chapman (anonymous) – Ovid's Banquet of Sense
Gervase Markham – The Poem of Poems, or Syon's Muse
Robert Southwell (anonymous) – Saint Peter's Complaint
Edmund Spenser
Amoretti and Epithalamion ("written not long since")
Colin Clouts Come Home Againe

Births
March 21 – Ferdinando Ughelli, Italian church historian (died 1670)
before June – Thomas Carew, English poet (died 1640)
October 18 – Edward Winslow, English theologian, pamphleteer and New England politician (died 1655)
December 4 – Jean Chapelain, French poet and critic (died 1674)
Unknown dates
Bihari Lal, Hindi poet (died 1663)
Jean Desmarets, French writer and dramatist (died 1676)
Juan Eusebio Nieremberg, Spanish Jesuit writer and mystic (died 1658)

Deaths
February – William Painter, English translator (born c. 1540)
February 21 – Robert Southwell, English poet and Catholic martyr (born c. 1561)
March 18 – Jean de Sponde, French poet (born 1557)
April 25 – Torquato Tasso, Italian poet (born 1544)
May 25 – Valens Acidalius, German poet and critic writing in Latin (born 1567)
June 23 – Louis Carrion, Flemish scholar (born 1547)
October 5 – Faizi, Indian poet and scholar (born 1547)
November 5 – Luis Barahona de Soto, Spanish poet 1548)

References

 
Years of the 16th century in literature